Vanilla and Chocolate is a 2004  Italian romance film directed by Ciro Ippolito.

Cast 

Maria Grazia Cucinotta: Penelope
Joaquín Cortés: Carlos
Alessandro Preziosi: Andrea
Roberta Alberti: young Penelope
Serra Yilmaz: Diomira
Ernesto Mahieux: Briganti
Licinia Lentini: Irene

References

External links

2004 films
Italian romantic drama films
2004 romantic drama films
2000s Italian films